Aegyptus is a computer moderated play-by-mail (PBM) game. Announced in 1984, it was published by World Campaigns

History and development
Aegyptus was a role-playing play-by-mail game published by World Campaigns. It was computer moderated, and open-ended. It was a strategic-tactical, historical game of medium to hard complexity. 

The game was announced in the May–June 1984 issue of Paper Mayhem.

Gameplay
The game setting was an imaginary country on historical Earth, akin to the Greek city-states. Players roleplayed through the copper, bronze and iron ages. Up to 150 players could play in a game. As part of gameplay, "Players begin as the leader of a herding tribe. You progress to a farming tribe, to a city, state, and then an empire." Play possibilities and turn fees increased as players rose in stature, with $15 turn fees for players leading empires which could comprise thousands of people. Combat, economics, and technology were elements of gameplay.

Reception
Editor Bob McLain reviewed the game in a 1984 issue of Gaming Universal. He recommended the game, stating that it was "A truly impressive game of developing civilization." Overall, McLain rated it four stars of five, or "exceptional".

See also
 List of play-by-mail games

References

Bibliography

Further reading

 
 
 
 
 

Multiplayer games
Play-by-mail games